Kavus Torabi (born 5 December 1971) is a British-Iranian musician and composer, record label owner and broadcaster. A multi-instrumentalist, he is known for his work in the psychedelic, avant-garde rock field (primarily as a guitarist). Torabi was one of the founding members of the Monsoon Bassoon (as singer, guitarist and one of the two primary composers), was a member of cult Progressive rock group Cardiacs, and fronts and plays guitar for the current lineup of legendary psychedelic band Gong.

Torabi also leads his own group Knifeworld and is a member of Guapo and the Utopia Strong. He sometimes tours and records with Mediæval Bæbes and Rob Crow, and frequently collaborates with other notable artists working in left-field music.

Early life

Torabi was born in Iran to an Iranian father and an English mother. His family moved to Plymouth, UK, when he was eighteen months old; originally planning to return once his father had made sufficient money, but ending up settling permanently following the 1979 Islamic revolution in Iran. "Most" of Torabi's relatives remain in Iran, but he himself has never returned.

Torabi remembers that his family were not particularly musical (although his mother knew a few guitar chords) but that he himself was interested in music from an early age (in particular the music from TV shows). Torabi taught himself music by inventing his own form of notation and using it to score out the theme from CHIPS. When he was seven, his family bought a piano and he used it as a compositional tool – already writing songs of his own, he showed little interest in learning those of others. From 1980, he became interested in pop music (initially becoming inspired by Brian Setzer and the Stray Cats) and began teaching himself how to play guitar. Eight years later, aged sixteen, he discovered his main musical touchstone in the form of Cardiacs, although in the interim he had taught himself more about music by sequential obsessions with various other bands and music forms.

Career

Die Laughing (1988–1993)

Torabi's first significant band was Die Laughing, formed in 1988. This was a psychedelic/thrash metal group formed in Torabi's native Plymouth in which he played guitar and in which he first met his close friend and collaborator, Dan Chudley. (Chudley – a fellow guitarist and singer – has been part of Torabi's life for most of his musical career, and the two are noted for their interlocking, highly complex guitar style.) Die Laughing released three demos before they eventually split in 1993.

The Monsoon Bassoon (1994–2001)

In 1994, Torabi reunited with Chudley, who had been playing in a band called Squid Squad since the previous year. The two formed a new band called The Monsoon Bassoon, in which they were joined by bass player Laurie Osbourne and two more Squid Squad members (singing clarinet/flute/sax player Sarah Measures and drummer Jamie Keddie). Their musical – an energetic and tuneful form of psychedelic math rock – was built around Torabi and Chudley's singular compositions. The group soon relocated from Plymouth to Leyton, East London and began to gain underground attention, releasing recordings on their own Weird Neighbourhood Records label.

Despite scoring several Single of the Week awards in New Musical Express, the Monsoon Bassoon failed to get signed to a larger label or make a significant commercial breakthrough, although they did receive critical acclaim and a cult following for their unorthodox approach and sound. The band released a lone, well-regarded studio album (I Dig Your Voodoo) and five singles, and split up in 2001 following the exit of Keddie. Many of the band's recordings remain unreleased.

Cardiacs (2003–2008)

Since the mid-1990s Torabi had had a close working relationship with Tim Smith (lead singer and songwriter for Cardiacs), who produced the majority of The Monsoon Bassoon's recordings. Having been Cardiacs' guitar technician since around 1995, Torabi joined the band as second guitarist in 2003 (replacing Jon Poole). His first appearance with Cardiacs was at their now legendary three-date Garage concerts (at which they played only archive material from their first two cassette releases, although he was not publicly revealed as a full member until the next round of concerts. 

Torabi featured on the two songs released on Cardiacs' 2007 single, Ditzy Scene (for which he also wrote the lyrics). He also contributed to recordings for a subsequent album tentatively titled LSD (which remains unreleased). Cardiacs suspended activities in 2008 following the hospitalisation of Tim Smith, and the line-up remained on hold during his period of illness.

Knifeworld (circa 2002–present)

Knifeworld is Torabi's current main band. Originally a solo project, it has since become a full band . Knifeworld originated from around the time of the Monsoon Bassoon's breakup, but only released its first material eight years later following a long recording period. Knifeworld is currently Torabi's main compositional vehicle, in many ways continuing ideas and approaches to polyrhythmic songwriting and arrangements that were germinated in The Monsoon Bassoon.

Guapo and the Holy Family

Torabi joined the instrumental avant-psychedelic/progressive rock band Guapo as permanent guitarist in 2006. He has toured extensively with the band, and has co-written all albums since 2013. In 2021 the band (while retaining the same lineup) took on a new identity as The Holy Family, releasing an eponymous debut album in July of that year.

Mediæval Bæbes

Torabi regularly plays guitar and cuatro as a recording and touring musician and occasionally writes with the Mediæval Bæbes.

Believers Roast

Torabi started the label Believers Roast in 2009, initially as a platform to release his own music, however since the release of 2010's The Leader Of The Starry Skies it has released music Torabi feels particularly strongly about, including The Gasman, Thumpermonkey and Redbus Noface.

Collaborations with Steve Davis (The Interesting Alternative Show, The Utopia Strong, DJ work)

Between 2010 and 2018 Torabi co-presented "The Interesting Alternative Show" with former snooker player Steve Davis on Brentwood radio station Phoenix FM. The show focussed largely on experimental, avant-progressive, psychedelic, electronic, folk and rock music with an emphasis on new releases. Guests included Daevid Allen, Chris Cutler, Charles Hayward, Bob Drake, Sanguine Hum and Stars in Battledress. During, and subsequent to, the broadcast of The Interesting Alternative Show, Torabi and Davis worked together presenting live public DJ sets, including an appearance at the 2016 Glastonbury Festival.

Torabi and Davis subsequently formed an electronic music band called the Utopia Strong (in which Torabi plays guitar and harmonium, Davis plays modular analog synthesizer and Coil associate/Holy Family member Michael J. York plays pipes, drones, synthesizers and electronics) Their first album The Utopia Strong was released on 13th September 2019 and has been followed by a series of three live recordings available as digital downloads and limited edition vinyl issues. In April 2021 they released the double autobiography Medical Grade Music.

Other musical projects

Work with Dan Chudley

Since the breakup of The Monsoon Bassoon, Torabi has maintained an ongoing (if interrupted) musical relationship with Dan Chudley, resulting in several other projects. The first of these was Miss Helsinki, a more straightforward rock band which recorded a couple of tracks and played a few acoustic gigs in 2002. The band failed to find a steady lineup (despite assistance from Richard Larcombe from Stars In Battledress and from Monsoon Bassoon drummer Jamie Keddie) and consequently folded. Torabi, Chudley and Keddie worked together again when they formed another rock band, Authority, in 2005 (the lineup was completed by Craig Fortnam of North Sea Radio Orchestra on bass). Authority recorded several songs and played live over the next two years, but never released anything beyond a couple of MySpace uploads. The band split in 2007 due to the various members' other commitments and Chudley's move to Cornwall.

Torabi and Chudley have worked on another project together – the instrumental Hatchjaw and Bassett, which Chudley has described as "acoustic spiritual music". This project has not released any records, although a video featuring the duo and their music has appeared on YouTube.

Work with Spider Stacy (2001–2003)

Before the split of The Monsoon Bassoon, Torabi toured as guitarist with former Pogues member Spider Stacy's group, Wisemen (which also featured other ex-Pogues).  After line-up changes, the group became The Vendettas.

Torabi co-wrote and produced an album with Spider in 2003, but the project was shelved in the wake of the Pogues' reunion that year. Torabi has subsequently expressed an interest in releasing the album on his own Believer's Roast label.

Admirals Hard

Torabi is a member of Admirals Hard, an occasional "sea-shanty supergroup" made up of members of London math-rock bands and avant-garde folk groups (Stars in Battledress, Tunng, Max Tundra, Foe and The Monsoon Bassoon) and fronted by singer Andy Carne. Torabi plays mandolin and guitar (and sings backing vocals) for the group.

Chrome Hoof

He played guitar with Chrome Hoof between 2009 and 2010 (contributing to the 2010 album Crush Depth).

Musical style

Torabi is reluctant to be pegged as a particular stylist, and his music has always drawn on a wide variety of influences. These have included indie and alternative rock (Pixies, Shudder to Think, XTC), British and American art/progressive rock (Cardiacs, Henry Cow, Yes, Hatfield and the North, Don Caballero), folk music, minimalist music, various forms of hard rock and heavy metal (Voivod, Melvins) and many others. His compositions are often typically dense, polyrhythmic and based in the lydian mode.

Personal life 
One of Torabi's most cherished memories is of being given a satchel by BBC broadcaster and newsreader Fiona Bruce.

Discography

Studio albums
Hip to the Jag (2020)
Heaven's Sun (with Richard Wileman) (2023)

Extended plays
Solar Divination  (2018)

References

External links
 
 

Iranian guitarists
People from Tehran
1971 births
Living people
Iranian emigrants to the United Kingdom
People educated at Plymouth College
Gong (band) members
21st-century guitarists
Chrome Hoof members
Guapo (band) members
Cardiacs members
Knifeworld members
North Sea Radio Orchestra members